Proffit may refer to
Proffit, Virginia, an unincorporated community in the United States
Proffit Historic District
Mason Proffit, a country rock band from Illinois, United States
George H. Proffit (1807–1847), a U.S. Representative from Indiana
William Proffit (1936–2018), American orthodontist